Árpád Szendy [] (11 August 1863 in Szarvas – 10 September 1922 in Budapest) was a Hungarian pianist, composer and teacher.

Biography
Szendy's father was a college professor. The original name of the family was Golnhofer. Szendy studied with Henri Gobbi, Franz Liszt and Hans Koessler at the Franz Liszt Academy of Music in Budapest. From 1888, he taught piano at the academy, becoming a full professor in 1891. In 1920, he was appointed director of the academy, but resigned a year later due to health reasons. He died of heart disease in 1922.

Szendy's compositions include several orchestral pieces, a piano concerto, a concert fantasy for piano and orchestra, the opera "Mária", two string quartets, and a variety of piano pieces and songs. His editions of Carl Czerny's etudes "School of Finger Dexterity" were used for a century in Hungary.

Szendy had many students; the best-known one is Ilona Kabos.

References
 Carl Dahlhaus, Hans Heinrich Eggebrecht (edit.): Brockhaus-Riemann-Musik-Enzyklopädie. Musikverlag Budapest, 1998, .
 Révai Nagy Lexikona. 17th edition. Published by Révai Budapest, 1925.
 Aladár Szabolcsi Bence Tóth: Music Enzyklopädie. Musikverlag Budapest, 1965.
 Valentine Vázsonyi: Ernst von Dohnányi. Musikverlag Budapest, 1971.

External links
 Aladár Tóth:Árpád Szendy (hungarian)
 http://lfze.hu/en/notable-alumni/-/asset_publisher/fLQ9RSuRgn0e/content/szendy-arpad/10192;jsessionid=309336073341E43B62F613DEBCDC9932 (hungarian)

Hungarian composers
Hungarian male composers